Andy Nogger is the third album by the German Krautrock band Kraan. It is the last studio album from Kraan's original line up.

Track listing
All songs composed by Kraan.

Side one
 "Stars" – 5:17
 "Andy Nogger" – 3:50
 "Nam Nam" – 5:50
 "Son of the Sun" – 5:02

Side two
 "Holiday am Matterhorn" – 7:40
 "Home" – 5:40
 "Yellow Bamboo" – 4:25

Personnel
 Peter Wolbrandt – guitar, vocals
 Jan Fride – drums, percussion
 Helmut Hattler – bass
 Johannes Pappert – alto sax

Production
 Conny Plank – engineer
 Hans Lampe – assistant
 Walter Holzbauer – supervision

References

External links
 

1974 albums
Kraan albums
Intercord albums